Tams is an unincorporated community in Raleigh County, West Virginia, United States.

Construction of the town started in May 1909 by the Gulf Smokeless Coal Company, which was mining the Beckley coal seam. Serviced by the Virginian Railway, the town initially included 125 houses. By 1920, that number had increased to 185, with a population of 1250.  Running water, and electricity for house lights, were supplied water from the town water supply, and power house.

References

Unincorporated communities in West Virginia
History of West Virginia
Former populated places in West Virginia
Coal towns in West Virginia